The South Island Limited was a passenger express train operated by the New Zealand Railways Department (NZR) between 1949 and 1970. It operated over the almost  route between Christchurch and Invercargill. It was replaced by the Southerner.

Previous expresses
Expresses between Christchurch and Dunedin began operating when the Main South Line opened. These services were the precursor to the South Island Limited and were the flagship of New Zealand's railways in the nineteenth century. Accordingly they had the most modern motive power and rolling stock available. They were initially hauled by members of the first J class and limited to a speed of 60km/h, resulting in a journey time of eleven hours, but the timetable was accelerated with the introduction of the K class. The K locomotives could achieve speeds of up to 90km/h and they helped to quicken the schedule, with the T class handling the train on the hilly section between Oamaru and Dunedin. Upon their introduction in 1885, the N class took on the express duties, followed by the U and UB classes. The Q and A class cut the journey's time to eight hours in the early years of the twentieth century.

In 1904, it became possible to operate an express all the way from Christchurch to Invercargill in a single day. The Dunedin-Invercargill run was treated as an extension of the Christchurch-Dunedin express, and the train was sometimes called the Invercargill Express. In March 1914, it was possible to travel from Christchurch to Invercargill in thirteen hours. AB class locomotives capable of speeds of 107km/h took over from the A and Q locomotives from 1915, but in the 1930s and in wartime, maximum SIMT speed was limited to 80km/h and track and running conditions did not allow the acceleration of the late 1940s when the express, at its zenith, reached sustained higher speeds on the Canterbury Plains and became the South Island Limited.

A night express service, including two sleeping carriages, ran from 1928. The four sleepers for the service were rebuilt at Addington Railway Workshops from ordinary cars, each with an 8-berth compartment for ladies, and a 12-berth for men. The sleeping cars had gone by 1935 and by 1943 the only night trains were on Sundays. From 1949 to 30 September 1979 trains 189/190 ran an overnight weekend express Christchurch-Dunedin departing at a late 10.30/10.50pm on Friday-Sunday to arrive 6.30/6.58am on Saturday and Monday. Until 1971 the steam-hauled train consisted of a 56-foot second class carriage, sleeping carriage and two 50-foot first-class carriages. The diesel hauled 189/190 of 1971-79 consists excluded sleeping carriages again and usually consisted of sets of only a partitioned 56ft first-class and two 56ft second class carriages, guards van and 7 container and mail wagons. Only the connecting part of 190 leaving Invercargill at 6:35pm was ever well patronised with sports team and weekend varsity students. In its last years, 1976-79 189/190 was second class only but did provide a connection for Dunedin students and Otago Peninsular residents on the new Cook Strait ferry express, providing a low cost, but poorly patronised interisland connection, with patronage given at 10-93 (average 50) in July 1979.

Operation
In 1939, the second J class was introduced, followed by the JA class in 1946. These locomotives allowed the service's schedule to be accelerated, and on 1 August 1949, the South Island Limited was introduced. It operated three days a week, supplemented on M,W,F by a limited stop mail express Train 175 which left Christchurch 09.00 and reached Dunedin 17.25 and northbound, Train 160 leaving Dunedin 08.45; Timaru 14.00 to arrive Hornby 16.59 and Christchurch 1713.There was only, one daily Ferry Express Christchurch - Invercargill train 145 south on Tuesday, Thursday and Saturday and train 174 north and on the Christchurch Dunedin sector the timetable was very similar to the later 1956-1970 South Island Limited in both directions. Sunday day expresses operated only Invercargill Dunedin return The pre 1956 South Island Limited was a true prestige service with only a few 
short stops compared with the other mail and ferry express. The 1949-1956 South Island Limited had only 3 intermediate stops to Dunedin and 8 to Invercargill with stops at Ashburton, Timaru, Oamaru, Dunedin, Milton, Balclutha, Clinton and Gore on the way to Invercargill. In 1956 the South Island Limited lost much of its status and ceased to be a true ' Limited' in the public eye with many additional stop and a slower timetable. 

In its very early days, it was occasionally operated by AB class engines, but the more powerful J and JA locomotives quickly became the usual motive power, and they were famous for hauling long strings of the familiar red cars at higher average speeds of 40-42mph stop to start on the Christchurch-Oamaru section. Leaving Christchurch on 143 at 08.35 to reach, Dunedin 15.45 and Invercargill at 19.55 achieving a travel time between Christchurch and Dunedin of 7 hours and 10 minutes, and completing the entire journey to Invercargill in 11 hours 20 minutes. From 1956, consolidation of the daylight schedule into one express each way, resulted into an increase to 21 stops, but only 20 minutes added to the overall running table, Departure from Christchurch at 08.40 and arrival at Invercargill at 20.20. By this time, officials generally conceded that much faster running than the 50-55mph authorised was often required to meet the tight timetable  on a single track railway  over the Canterbury and Southland plains. The northbound South Island Limited, train 144 to connect with the Inter-Island Ferry, left Invercargill at 07.40 to arrive at Christchurch at 19.20 for a 17 min snack, before 144 moved on to Lyttelton with adequate time to connect with the inter-island ferry leaving Lyttelton at 20.30, generally required exceptional  performance of the JA class hauled expresses if 20 minutes or more late out of Timaru with the 100 miles to Christchurch and 6-7 scheduled stops with recovery speeds, sometimes exceeding 75mph  

In the immediate post-war years and until 1956, the general aim of two daylight expresses daily in both directions on the SIMT continued with the South Island Limited being supplemented on the peak demand days of Mon, Wed, Fri by a second stopping express, trains 160/175, which also provided an early morning departure from Dunedin, at 08.45 in the 1935 and 1952 timetables on the Dunedin express to Christchurch and southbound following the 'Limited' out of Christchurch at midday in the 1920s and 30s and postwar at 09.00 south to arrive at Dunedin at 17.25, two hours later than the South Island Limited.

However, train 160 and 175 continued to run as a relief holiday express until 1966 and these services were reincarnated as pure mail and express freight trains from 1970 to 1985 on essentially the same 1949 timetable, leaving Christchurch (Middleton) and Dunedin at 09.00 for arrival at 17.00, but stopping only at Timaru and Oamaru for half an hour for shunting. Cut off for the first night express freight would be 6.30pm and the train would not leave Moorehouse station until 7:00pm. 

The original consist of the South Island Limited was three first and four second class carriages providing 330 seats overall with a capacity of over 500 in the school holidays. By the late 1960s, the holiday-peak traffic had eroded and the usual consist for most of the year was two first and two second class smoker and non-smoker carriages providing 176 seats. The main traffic for the South Island Limited was as a long-distance service to connect with the inter-island Union Steamship Company Steamer Express ferry at Lyttelton and to carry mail, with up to six ZP class wagons for maximum revenue.

Replacement
By 1970, steam locomotives had been almost entirely withdrawn from New Zealand. The North Island had been completely dieselised by the end of 1967, and the 1968 introduction of the DJ class diesel locomotives had led to the dieselisation of almost all of the South Island's services.

However, the South Island Limited continued to operate with steam motive power, repeating the pattern in the North Island (where the KA and JAs hauled the express and relief expresses until 1965, nine to ten years after steam had been replaced on NIMT freight and the Wairarapa line by 1955–56).

In the last years of the South Island Limited, intermediate stops were increased to 21 but overall journey time reduced to 11 hrs 40 minutes. The decision was finally taken to withdraw railcars and end the use of steam locomotives in 1967, with the order for the final nine DJ diesel-electric locomotives to replace the JAs on SIMT expresses and express freights, on 26 November 1967.

The South Island Limited was replaced by the diesel-hauled Southerner on 1 December 1970. This was not the end of the steam expresses, however; JA locomotives continued to work Friday and Sunday evening expresses on the same route for almost a year.

References

External links
 Encyclopaedia of New Zealand 1966 – Train Services
 Poster for South Island Limited Express
 Six-part photo pictorial by Wilson Lythgoe

Long-distance passenger trains in New Zealand
Named passenger trains of New Zealand
Railway services introduced in 1949
Railway services discontinued in 1970
1949 establishments in New Zealand
1970 disestablishments in New Zealand